The 1979 Honduran Segunda División was the 13th season of the Honduran Segunda División.  Under the management of Carlos Padilla, Atlético Fusep won the tournament after defeating Juventud Ribereña in the final series and obtained promotion to the 1980–81 Honduran Liga Nacional.

Final

 Atlético Fusep won 2–0 on aggregate.

References

Segunda
1979